United Nations Security Council Resolution 8 was adopted on August 29, 1946 by ten votes to none, with Australia abstaining.

Following up on Security Council Resolution 6, the Security Council reviewed requests for membership by People's Republic of Albania, the Mongolian People's Republic, Afghanistan, the Hashemite Kingdom of Transjordan, Ireland, Portugal, Iceland, Siam, and Sweden.  The Council recommended the General Assembly admit Afghanistan, Iceland, and Sweden. A recommendation for Siam's admission was given in Resolution 13 the following December.

See also
 List of United Nations Security Council Resolutions 1 to 100 (1946–1953)

References
Text of the Resolution at undocs.org

External links
 

 0008
Foreign relations of Iceland
Foreign relations of Sweden
 0008
 0008
 0008
 0008
 0008
 0008
 0008
 0008
1946 in Afghanistan
1946 in Albania
1946 in Mongolia
1946 in Jordan
1946 in Ireland
1946 in Portugal
1946 in Thailand
1946 in Sweden
1946 in Iceland
 0008
 0008
August 1946 events